František Vyskočil (3 September 1941 in Pelhřimov) is a Czech neuroscientist and a professor of physiology and neurophysiology at Charles University. Best known for his contributions in the field of non-quantal synaptic release of neurotransmitters, he is also a vocal supporter of the intelligent design hypothesis  and an avid violin player.

Biography

He graduated from the Faculty of Science of Charles University in Prague in 1968 and later divided his professional life between the Department of Physiology at the university and the Institute of Physiology of the Czech Academy of Sciences. He also worked as a Visiting Professor at the Department of Physiology, University of California, San Francisco.

Professor Vyskočil is a laureate of several prizes, most prominently the Purkynje Medal of the Czech Academy of Sciences and a silver Commemorative Medal of the Senate. He is a founding member of The Learned Society of the Czech Republic.

References 

1941 births
Living people
People from Pelhřimov
Czech neuroscientists
Czech physiologists
Academic staff of Charles University